Clunbury is a civil parish in Shropshire, England.  It contains 64 listed buildings that are recorded in the National Heritage List for England.  Of these, one is listed at Grade I, the highest of the three grades, two are at Grade II*, the middle grade, and the others are at Grade II, the lowest grade.  The parish contains the villages of Clunbury and Clunton, and smaller settlements including Kempton, Little Brampton, and Purslow, and is otherwise rural.  Most of the listed buildings are houses, farmhouses and farm buildings, many of which are timber framed, and some later encased or rebuilt in limestone.  The other listed buildings are two churches, one dating from the 12th century, bridges, a stone signpost, three milestones, a former watermill, a former malthouse, a war memorial, and a former smithy.


Key

Buildings

References

Citations

Sources

Lists of buildings and structures in Shropshire